Ingrid Yahoska Narvaez (born 15 February 1994 in Tola) is a Nicaraguan sprinter who specializes in the 400 metres. She represented Nicaragua at the 2012 Summer Olympics.

In 2019, she competed in the women's 400 metres event at the 2019 World Athletics Championships. She did not advance to compete in the semi-finals as she was disqualified after lane infringement.

References 

1994 births
Living people
People from Rivas Department
Nicaraguan female sprinters
Athletes (track and field) at the 2012 Summer Olympics
Olympic athletes of Nicaragua
Olympic female sprinters